Pseudoxerophila is a genus of gastropods belonging to the family Geomitridae.

The species of this genus are found in Mediterranean.

Species:

Pseudoxerophila bathytera 
Pseudoxerophila confusa 
Pseudoxerophila oertzeni

References

 Westerlund, C. A. &. Blanc, H. (1879). Aperçu sur la faune malacologique de la Grèce inclus l'Epire et la Thessalie. Coquilles extramarines. 161 pp. + errata (1 pp.), pl. 1-4. 
 Bank, R. A. (2017). Classification of the Recent terrestrial Gastropoda of the World. Last update: July 16th, 2017

Geomitridae